Istočno Sarajevo (lit. "East Sarajevo") is the de jure capital city of Republika Srpska entity of Bosnia and Herzegovina. It consists of a few suburban areas of pre-war Sarajevo which are now included in the Republika Srpska entity, and newly built areas.
With an area of 1450 km2, Istočno Sarajevo is one of the largest administrative areas in the Balkans.  As of 2013, it has a population of 61,516 inhabitants.
Istočno Sarajevo is the largest city in Republika Srpska in terms of area, while it is in fifth place in terms of population. It is the only city of the entity that includes several municipalities: Istočna Ilidža, Istočno Novo Sarajevo, Pale, Istočni Stari Grad, Sokolac and Trnovo. It is separated from Sarajevo and Canton Sarajevo by the Inter-Entity Boundary Line (IEBL). 
The City Administration of East Sarajevo is located in the municipality of Istočno Novo Sarajevo, in Stefana Nemanje Street.

History
At the start of the Bosnian War, in late summer 1992, the Serb members of the pre-war municipality of Novo Sarajevo, elected at the 1990 multiparty elections, left the municipal assembly and set up their own separate council (Srpsko Novo Sarajevo) in the building of the local community of Lukavica, headed by the Commissioner of the Presidency of the Republic of Srpska Dragan Đokanović.

Srpsko Sarajevo (Српско Сарајево, "Serbian Sarajevo"), as the part of the city under control of the Army of Republika Srpska during the war was known, was deemed the official capital of Republika Srpska.

Following the decision on the name of the cities in 2004 by the Constitutional Court of Bosnia and Herzegovina, which outruled the use of the prefix Srpski, the town was renamed Istočno Sarajevo (Eastern Sarajevo).

On 27 June 2014, a statue to Gavrilo Princip was inaugurated in Lukavica. The city park (gradski park) was also named after Princip.

Environment

Geography
East Sarajevo lies in the south-western part of the Sarajevo valley, in the middle of the Dinaric Alps. The city is surrounded by heavily forested hills and five major mountains. Last four are also known as Olympics mountains of Sarajevo (see also 1984 Winter Olympic Games in Sarajevo).

The Željeznica river is one of the city's chief geographic features. It flows through the city from south through the Trnovo, Kijevo, Krupac and Vojkovići, parts of East Sarajevo to the western part of Sarajevo, where it eventually meets up with the Bosna river.

Climate
East Sarajevo has a mild continental climate, lying between the climate zones of central Europe to the north and the Mediterranean to the south. The average yearly temperature is 9.5 °C, with January (-1.3 °C avg.) being the coldest month of the year and July (19.1 °C avg.) the warmest. The highest recorded temperature was 40.0 °C on 19 August 1946, while the lowest recorded temperature was −26.4 °C on 25 January 1942. On average, East Sarajevo has 68 summer days per year (temperature greater than or equal to 30.0 °C). The city typically experiences mildly cloudy skies, with an average yearly cloud cover of 59%. The cloudiest month is December (75% average cloud cover) while the clearest is August (37%). Moderate precipitation occurs fairly consistently throughout the year, with an average 170 days of rainfall. Suitable climatic conditions have allowed winter sports to flourish in the region, as exemplified by the Winter Olympics in 1984 that were celebrated in Sarajevo.

Administration

Municipalities
The City of Istočno Sarajevo consists of six municipalities. Three of which; Istočna Ilidža, Istočno Novo Sarajevo and Istočni Stari Grad, were formed by separating the existing pre-war municipalities of Sarajevo between the Republika Srpska and the Federation of Bosnia and Herzegovina. The municipalities of Pale and Trnovo were formed in the same way. The municipality of Sokolac is the only municipality that entered the City of Istočno Sarajevo as a whole.

The municipalities of Istočno Sarajevo are:
 Istočna Ilidža (pop. 14,763 in 2013)
 Istočno Novo Sarajevo (pop. 10,642 in 2013)
 Istočni Stari Grad (pop. 1,131 in 2013)
 The RS section of Pale (pop. 20,909 in 2013)
 Sokolac (pop. 12,021 in 2013)
 The RS section of Trnovo (pop. 2,050 in 2013)

Mayors 

 Nenad Samardžija, SDS (2013–2016)
 Nenad Vuković, PDP (2016–2020), mayor of Pale 2009–2016
 Ljubiša Ćosić, SNSD (2020 - first direct election), mayor of Istočno Novo Sarajevo 2012–2020

Demographics

According to the 2013 census results, the city of Istočno Sarajevo has a population of 61,516 inhabitants.

Ethnic groups
The ethnic composition of the municipality:

Economy
The city of East Sarajevo is the administrative, industrial, commercial, financial and cultural center of the eastern part of Republika Srpska. The position of East Sarajevo is strategically important, located near the biggest city of Bosnia and Herzegovina, the city of Sarajevo. East Sarajevo is easily accessible, having an airport close to the city - Sarajevo International Airport, and being a point of intersection of numerous roads.

East Sarajevo is one of the most important industrial centers in Bosnia and Herzegovina, well known for its companies: Elko, Famos, Energoinvest, Unis and others.

Economic preview
The following table gives a preview of total number of registered people employed in legal entities per their core activity (as of 2018):

Tourism 

The Jahorina Mountain is one of the highest mountains of the Dinaric system. It is 30 kilometers long mountain range, with several peaks, of which the highest peak Ogorjelica is 1916 meters above sea level. From Sarajevo it is distanced 28, from Banja Luka 200, of Belgrade 320, and 350 kilometers from Zagreb. The Jahorina ski resort is located on the slopes of Jahorina Mountain.

Sport 

The local football clubs are Slavija that plays in the First League of the Republika Srpska and Famos that competes in the Second League of the Republika Srpska.

Basketball Club Slavija is a basketball club from the City of East Sarajevo that competes in the National Championship of Bosnia and Herzegovina.

Also this city is a big volleyball center of Bosnia and Herzegovina. Men club OK Student Pale and women OK Jahorina Pale are competing in highest rank of Bosnia and Herzegovina (Premijer Liga) with good results, and OK Mokro Mokro (Pale) and OK Slavija are competing in second rank (First League of RS)

The 2019 European Youth Olympic Winter Festival was held in Sarajevo & Istočno Sarajevo, Bosnia and Herzegovina from 9 to 16 February.

International cooperation
List of Istočno Sarajevo's sister and twin cities:

 Kruševac
 Blace
 Krupanj
 Ub
 Čukarica

Gallery

See also
 Romanija
 Serbs of Sarajevo

References

External links 

 
 Tourist Organization Istočno Sarajevo 
 Portal Istočno Sarajevo - Forum
 Istočno Sarajevo portal
 University of Istočno Sarajevo
 Inés Aquilué & Estanislao Roca, Urban development after the Bosnian War: The division of Sarajevo’s territory and the construction of East Sarajevo
 Gruia Bădescu, Dwelling in the Post-War City Urban Reconstruction and Home-Making in Sarajevo, Revue d’études comparatives Est-Ouest 2015/4 (N° 46), pages 35 à 60
 James Schmitt, Sarajevo Redux: Socio-Spatial Outcomes and the Perpetuation of Fragility in a PostConflict City, TU Berlin 2019

 
Populated places in Istočno Sarajevo